Stenbolone acetate (brand name Stenobolone, Anatrofin; former developmental code names RS-2106, S-3760), also known as 2-methyl-4,5α-dihydro-δ1-testosterone 17β-acetate (2-methyl-δ1-DHT 17β-acetate) or as 2-methyl-5α-androst-1-en-17β-ol-3-one 17β-acetate, is a synthetic, injected anabolic–androgenic steroid (AAS) and derivative of dihydrotestosterone (DHT) which has been marketed in Spain. 

It is the C17β acetate ester of stenbolone, which is structurally related to 1-testosterone (Δ1-DHT; dihydroboldenone) and to drostanolone (2α-methyl-DHT).

See also
 List of androgen esters

References

Acetate esters
Androgen esters
Androgens and anabolic steroids
Androstanes
Enones
Prodrugs
World Anti-Doping Agency prohibited substances